The Ministry of Culture and Communications is responsible for promoting and protecting the culture in the Canadian province of Quebec. The current Minister is Nathalie Roy.

The minister was formed in 2012 after the Immigration portfolio was transferred from the former Minister of Culture and Immigration (Minister of Immigration and Cultural Communities) created in 2005 to the new Ministry of Immigration, Diversity and Inclusion. Since 1 April 2017, the Ministry of Culture and Communications also administers Quebec's provincial film classification rating system acquired from the former Régie du cinéma.

Responsibilities

A number of agencies report to the minister:

 Office québécois de la langue française
 Commission de toponymie du Québec

List of office holders
 Nathalie Roy 2018-
 Marie Montpetit 2017-2018
 Luc Fortin 2016-2017
 Hélène David 2014-2016
 Maka Kotto 2012-2014
 Kathleen Weil as Minister of Culture and Immigration 2010-2012

References

External links

http://www.diversite-culturelle.qc.ca/index.php?id=105&L=1&tx_bulletinsirre_pi2[year]=2007&tx_bulletinsirre_pi2[article]=2568
http://www.eu2005.lu/en/actualites/discours/2005/06/27quebec/index.html
http://www.mcccf.gouv.qc.ca/index.php?id=2328&tx_ttnews[tt_news]=215&no_cache=1
https://web.archive.org/web/20110716230543/http://www.ifacca.org/national_agency_news/2005/06/07/quebec-ministry-of-culture-and-communication/

Culture
Quebec
Quebec